Assembleia Nacional is a Portuguese expression meaning National Assembly. It may refer to:
National Assembly of Angola (Assembleia Nacional de Angola)
National People's Assembly of Guinea-Bissau (Assembleia Nacional Popular da Guiné-Bissau)
National Assembly of São Tomé and Príncipe (Assembleia Nacional de São Tomé e Principe)
, the Portuguese legislature during the Estado Novo (Portugal) (1933-1974)

See also
 National Assembly (disambiguation)